Nevala is a Finnish surname. Notable people with the surname include:

 Pauli Nevala (born 1940), Finnish javelin thrower
 Johannes Nevala (born 1966), Finnish artist

See also
 Alec Nevala-Lee (born 1980), American novelist, biographer and science fiction writer

Finnish-language surnames